Deiyai Regency is one of the regencies (kabupaten) in the Indonesian province of Central Papua; it was formed on 29 October 2008 from the southeastern corner of the Paniai Regency area, and inaugurated by the Indonesian Minister of Home Affairs, Mardiyanto. The legal basis for the formation of this regency was the Law of the Republic of Indonesia of 2008 Number 55.

The new regency covers an area of  1,012.67 km2 (revised from 537.39 km2), and had a population of 62,998 at the 2010 Census, consisting of 31,843 men and 31,115 women; the 2020 Census revealed a total of 99,091. with the gender disparity increased to 1.132:1. The administrative centre is at the town of Waghete.

Geography
The northern part of the regency's territory (comprising Tigi Barat, Tigi and Tigi Timur Districts) surrounds Lake Tigi. This lake is located 1,700 metres above sea level and has a depth of up to 150 metres. This lake has a very cold mountainous climate. Lake Tigi has extraordinary natural attractions, a cool and refreshing atmosphere, clear water, and a dazzling view at the foot of Mount Deiyai. The remaining districts (Kapiraya in the southwest and Bowobado in the south) are much less populated.

The regent is now based in the town of Waghete, which is part of the Tigi District. The new Regent's office was completed in 2010, built on a land area of 500 x 300 square metres, which was purchased from the local community. The town of Waghete is located on the edge of an ancient lake, namely Lake Tigi. The Tigi region is a valley unit, with a relatively flat plain especially around Lake Tigi.

Administrative Districts
Deiyai Regency comprises five districts (distrik), tabulated below with their populations at the 2010 Census and the 2020 Census. The table also includes the location of the district administrative centres, the number of villages (rural desa and urban kelurahan) in each district, and its post code.

Climate
Waghete has a subtropical highland climate (Af) with heavy to very heavy rainfall year-round.

References

External links
Statistics publications from Statistics Indonesia (BPS)

Regencies of Central Papua